Uday Mahurkar (born 28 September 1962) is an Indian journalist, political analyst and author. He was a deputy editor at the India Today group.
In October 2020, he has been appointed as the Information Commissioner by the Government of India.

Early life 

Mahurkar was born in Indore, Madhya Pradesh. His family moved to Gujarat after independence. He had his education in Baroda, a former Maratha Princely state. He graduated in Indian history Culture and Archaeology from Maharaja Sayajirao University in 1983 and joined The Indian Express in the same year as a sub-editor at Ahmedabad.

In 2017, Mahurkar authored the book Marching with a Billion about the model of Narendra Modi's governance as Prime Minister. The book's foreword is written by economist Professor Klaus Schwab, founder and architect of the World Economic Forum.

Books 

Marching with a Billion Published by Penguin Random House India 
Centrestage Published by Random House India
Veer Savarkar: The Man Who Could Have Prevented Partition (2021) published by Rupa Publication India

References

External links 
Verified Twitter Account
Facebook

Uday Opinions

Indian male journalists
Indian male writers
1962 births
Living people
Indian male television journalists
Gujarati people
Writers from Indore